Heaton may refer to:

People
 Heaton (surname)
 Sir Heaton Rhodes (1861–1956), New Zealand politician and lawyer
 HeatoN, pseudonym of Emil Christensen (born 1984), Swedish Counter-Strike player

Places

Great Britain
 Heaton, Greater Manchester, district in the west of Bolton, England
 Heaton, Lancaster, in Heaton-with-Oxcliffe, near Lancaster, England
 Heaton, Newcastle upon Tyne, area in the east-end of Newcastle upon Tyne, Tyne and Wear, England
 Heaton, West Yorkshire, a village and a ward in Bradford, England
 The Four Heatons, four suburbs of Stockport, Greater Manchester, England
 Heaton Chapel
 Heaton Moor
 Heaton Mersey
 Heaton Norris
 Heaton, Staffordshire
 Heaton Castle (anciently Heton), in the parish of Cornhill-on-Tweed, Northumberland, seat of the Grey family
 Heaton Park, large park in Manchester, England

United States
 Heaton, Arizona
 Heaton, North Carolina
 Heaton, North Dakota

See also
 
 Heatons, an Irish department store